Nawada Lok Sabha constituency is one of the 40 Lok Sabha (parliamentary) constituencies in Bihar state in eastern India.

Assembly segments
Presently, Nawada Lok Sabha constituency comprises the following five Vidhan Sabha (legislative assembly) segments:

Members of Parliament
The following is the list of the Members of Parliament elected from this Lok Sabha constituency:

Election results

General elections 2019

General elections 2014

References

See also
 Nawada district
 List of Constituencies of the Lok Sabha

Lok Sabha constituencies in Bihar
Politics of Nawada district
Politics of Sheikhpura district